A by-election was held for the New South Wales Legislative Assembly electorate of Tenterfield on 24 August 1874 because Robert Abbott had been appointed Secretary for Mines in the first Parkes ministry. Such ministerial by-elections were usually uncontested.

Edward Jones was an auctioneer from Glen Innes, and this was the first and only time he was a candidate for the Legislative Assembly.

Dates

Result

Robert Abbott was appointed Secretary for Mines in the first Parkes ministry.

See also
Electoral results for the district of Tenterfield
List of New South Wales state by-elections

References

1874 elections in Australia
New South Wales state by-elections
1870s in New South Wales